Shantisagara may refer to:

 Shanti Sagara, also called Sulekere (Kannada: ಸೂಳೆಕೆರೆ) Asia's second largest irrigation tank.
 Shantisagar (1872–1955), Digambar Jain Acharya of the 20th century, and the first Digambar Jain monk to wander in North India after several centuries. He was given the title Charitra Chakravarti.